1. FC Viktoria 07 Kelsterbach is a German association football club based in Kelsterbach, Hesse.

History
The club was founded 1907, and after briefly suspending play during World War I, re-established itself in 1918. The club played as an amateur local side during the inter-war period. After World War II Viktoria merged with TSG Kelsterbach to become KSG Kelsterbach and in May 1947 again took on the name 1. FC Viktoria.

The club was able to advance as high as the fourth division in the Landesliga Hessen-Süd from 1968 to 1974, with a single season spent in the Landesliga Hessen-Mitte (IV) in 1971–72, but were relegated the following season.

Viktoria has enjoyed some success in the local amateur ranks capturing sixth and seventh division titles in 1993, 1995, and 2004. A vice-championship in the Bezirksoberliga Wiesbaden (VI) in 2006 led to promotion to the Landesliga Hessen-Mitte (V), now the Verbandsliga (VI). Kelsterbach finished runners-up in the league in 2014–15, thereby qualifying for the promotion round to the Hessenliga were the club was however unsuccessful. In the following season Kelsterbach won the league and was promoted to the Hessenliga.

Honours
The club's honours:
 Verbandsliga Hessen-Mitte
 Champions: 2016
 Runners-up: 2015
 Bezirksoberliga Wiesbaden (VI)
 Champions: 1995, 2004
 Bezirksliga Wiesbaden (VII)
 Champions: 1967, 1993

References

External links
 Official website 
 Das deutsche Fußball-Archiv historical German domestic league tables 

Football clubs in Germany
Football clubs in Hesse
Association football clubs established in 1907
1907 establishments in Germany